Inger Lise Nyberg (30 November 1942 – 1 September 2020) was a Norwegian politician for the Conservative Party.

She was a deputy representative to the Parliament of Norway from Sør-Trøndelag during the term 1985–1989. In total she met during 17 days of parliamentary session.

She was also a board member of Folketrygdfondet from 1990 to 1994.

References

1942 births
2020 deaths
Deputy members of the Storting
Conservative Party (Norway) politicians
Sør-Trøndelag politicians
Norwegian women in politics
Women members of the Storting